Play, also known as Grupo Play, is a teen Mexican band made in 2006 out of teenagers from the reality show for kids Código F.A.M.A. made by the giant company Televisa. There are 7 members in the band and only 6 out of 7 of the band were in a telenovela from Televisa. They have already had their debut CD released in Mexico. In their official website they state that their reality show, and telenovelas Código F.A.M.A., Alegrijes y Rebujos, and Mision S.O.S is behind them. The group disbanded in 2007 because of problems with their record label.

Discography
2006 Play.

Members
Miguel Martínez winner of codigo fama 1
María Chacón received silver medal in codigo fama
Michelle Álvarez
Gladys Gallegos received silver medal in codigo fama 1
Alejandro Rivera
Roxana Puente
Anhuar Escalante participated in Codigo FAMA 2

External links
Esmas.com: Official Play website
MySpace.com: official Play page

Mexican pop music groups
Mexican dance musicians